An Óige (meaning "Youth"), or the Irish Youth Hostel Association (IYHA), is a non-profit organisation providing youth hostel accommodation across the Republic of Ireland. An Óige is a member of  Hostelling International.

Background

An Óige was founded on 7 May 1931 by an organising committee which included Thekla Beere, Shane Bodkin, and Chalmers (Terry) Trench. The group had been inspired by the success of the Jugendherbergen in Germany. An Óige's first youth hostel was opened at Lough Dan, near Roundwood, in County Wicklow. An Óige was formed as a membership-based organisation and at its peak had some 15,000 members and ran 55 hostels. It is now a member of Hostelling International.

Around the year 1990, the organisation bought the former convent school and orphanage complex at 60-61 Mountjoy Street, built circa 1865, and remodelled it for use as a hostel. This became used as the main headquarters for An Óige.

As of 2017, the organisation operated 24 youth hostels in the Republic of Ireland. In May 2019, An Óige closed the Dublin International Youth Hostel, which was then its main/headquarters facility and reportedly accounted for 60% of its revenue at the time. By late 2019, An Óige was running 18 hostels, with franchise rights to a further 10. During 2020, all hostels remained closed, as part of the response to the COVID-19 pandemic in Ireland.

In October 2019 the site of the former Headquarters on Mountjoy Street was put on the market at a guide price of €5 million. As of August 2022, the site is now in use as a private hostel named Leevin Hostel Mountjoy.

Objectives
An Óige, the Irish Youth Hostel Association, has a number of charitable aims. These include to support a "love and appreciation of the countryside" by providing "simple hostel accommodation for [people] whilst on their travels", to foster an appreciation of Irish culture and heritage, to co-operate with Irish organisations which seek to preserve the countryside and walking routes, and to foster associations with similar organisations in other countries.

The organisation is a registered charity in Ireland.

References

External links
An Óige Official website
 

Tourism in the Republic of Ireland
Backpacking
Environmental organisations based in Ireland
Hostelling International member associations
Non-profit organisations based in the Republic of Ireland